Robert Joseph Guindon (born September 4, 1943) is a former utility player in Major League Baseball who played briefly for the Boston Red Sox during the  season.

Biography
A native of Brookline, Massachusetts, Guindon was used in pinch-hitting duties in three games, and also had starts at first base (1) and left field (1). Guindon posted a .125 batting average (1-for-8), including a double and one walk.

Guindon's minor league baseball career spanned ten seasons, from  until .

Sources

Boston Red Sox players
Olean Red Sox players
Major League Baseball first basemen
Baseball players from Massachusetts
1943 births
Sportspeople from Brookline, Massachusetts
Living people
English High School of Boston alumni